Giorgio Bernini (9 November 1928 – 22 October 2020) was an Italian jurist, academic and politician. He was the father of Anna Maria Bernini.

Biography
Giorgio Bernini graduated in law in 1950; he was a lawyer since 1951 and cassationist since 1965. He was also a university professor in Ferrara (1964–1966), Padua (1966–1970) and in other foreign universities.

He often collaborated with the UN: he was a member of the commission for International Trade Law (1969–1972) and of the non-governmental organization of the United Nations (1986–1994), of which he was honorary president.

Elected to the Chamber of Deputies in 1994 with the Pole of Freedoms, he served as Minister of Foreign Trade in the first Berlusconi government. In 1996 he left politics.

In 1999 he resigned from the Antitrust Authority to be able to return to the profession of lawyer privately. In 2001 he was appointed president of the Italian Railway Network and vice president of the Confindustria of Lazio.

Bernini died on 22 October 2020 at the age of 91.

References

1928 births
2020 deaths
Politicians from Bologna
Forza Italia politicians
Deputies of Legislature XII of Italy
Jurists from Bologna